Melody Market or G-6 Markaz or Civic Center is a commercial center and market area located in Sector G-6, Islamabad. The area also houses National Bank of Pakistan's headoffice.

Food park 
A food park was established in the Melody commercial area in 2003.

Incidents
The business activity at the park was affected by the Siege of Lal Masjid (located near by) in 2007 and later due to a suicide blast in 2008.

References 

Commercial centres in Islamabad